Javier Olaizola Rodríguez (born 28 November 1969) is a Spanish retired footballer who played mostly as a right back, and the most recent manager of CD Tudelano.

Most of his 13-year professional career was spent with Mallorca, with which he appeared in 330 competitive matches and won two major titles.

Playing career
Born in San Sebastián, Gipuzkoa, Olaizola's first professional club was SD Eibar in his native Basque Country, in the second division. Subsequently, he played two seasons with Real Burgos CF, going on to suffer two consecutive drops and returning for a second spell with his previous team afterwards.

In 1995, Olaizola signed with RCD Mallorca, immediately becoming an undisputed starter as well as team captain and helping the Balearic Islands side to the 1998 Spanish Supercup against La Liga giants FC Barcelona, as well as a second place in the following year's UEFA Cup Winners' Cup. His first and only goal in the top flight – and overall – came on 17 December 2000, as he scored a last-minute equaliser at RC Celta de Vigo (2–2).

Coaching career
Olaizola played only 27 matches in his last two years combined, due to several injuries and age, and retired at almost 35. He then had brief spells as manager, with Mallorca's youth teams and Antiguoko (also a youth club, in the Basque region).

On 6 December 2016, after Fernando Vázquez's dismissal, Olaizola – who was in charge of the reserves – was appointed manager of Mallorca, who now competed in the second level. He was himself sacked the following 4 April, after his side was seriously threatened with relegation.

Olaizola returned to reserve management on 6 March 2018, taking over Atlético Levante UD of the Tercera División. Four months later, having won their group and then promotion on penalties against UD Ibiza in the play-off final, he left.

In June 2019, Olaizola took over at third-tier Arenas Club de Getxo in his native region.

Personal life
Olaizola's older brother, Julio (19 years his senior), was also a footballer and a defender. He played in ten top-flight seasons with Real Sociedad.

Managerial statistics

Honours
Mallorca
Copa del Rey: 2002–03; Runner-up 1997–98
Supercopa de España: 1998
UEFA Cup Winners' Cup runner-up: 1998–99

References

External links

1969 births
Living people
Spanish footballers
Footballers from San Sebastián
Association football defenders
La Liga players
Segunda División players
SD Eibar footballers
Real Burgos CF footballers
RCD Mallorca players
Basque Country international footballers
Spanish football managers
Segunda División managers
Primera Federación managers
Segunda División B managers
RCD Mallorca managers
RCD Mallorca B managers
Arenas Club de Getxo managers
Atlético Levante UD managers